North Darfur State ( Wilāyat Šamāl Dārfūr; Shamal Darfor) is one of the wilayat or states of Sudan. It is one of the five states composing the Darfur region.  It has an area of 296,420 km2 and an estimated population of approximately 1,583,000 (2006). Al-Fashir is the capital of the state.  Other significant towns include Ailliet, Kebkabiya, Kutum, Mellit (Malit), Tawilah and Umm Keddada (Umm Kadadah).

Geography
North Darfur occupies more than half of the territory of the Darfur region, and includes part of the Marrah Mountains (Jebel Marra). The northern part is entirely desert. To the south there is slightly more rainfall with the eastern side being plains with low sandy hills, while the volcanic Marrah Mountains occupy most of the western side of the south. In the southern portion the most important crops are millet, maize and peanuts.

North Darfur is bounded on the northwest by Libya, on the north by Northern State, on the east by Northern State and North Kurdufan, on the southeast by South Kurdufan, on the south by South Darfur, and on the west by West Darfur and the Republic of Chad.

History
North Darfur shares much of the history of Darfur.  It was the center of the Sultanate of Darfur and contained both its capital al-Fashir and its biggest trading city Kobbei.

Former lieutenant general, Armed Forces Chief of Staff, and defense minister Ibrahim Suleiman Hassan served as governor of 
North Darfur 2001–2003, until being dismissed by al-Bashir.

Notes and references

External links
State profile
 "Fresh hopes for North Darfur" by Julie Flint, BBC News From Our Correspondent, 14 June 2007

 
States of Sudan
Darfur